The 52nd Fighter Wing (52 FW) is a wing of the United States Air Force stationed at Spangdahlem Air Base, Germany. It flies the F-16CJ fighter aircraft. It was activated in 1948, but derives significant elements of its history from the predecessor Second World War 52nd Fighter Group, which is now the 52nd Operations Group, subordinate to the wing.

The wing provides United States Air Forces in Europe - Air Forces Africa and/or the NATO Supreme Allied Commander Europe with mission-ready personnel and systems. The assigned F-16 aircraft can be tasked to suppress enemy air defenses, provide close air support, carry out air interdiction, counter-air, strategic attack, and combat search and rescue. The wing also supports contingencies and operations other than war as required.

In concert with USAFE wings at Ramstein Air Base, Germany, the 52nd Fighter Wing directly supports the strategic mobility mission once conducted at Rhein-Main Air Base, Germany. The wing provides logistics support for C-17 Globemaster III and C-5 Galaxy aircraft, crew, passengers and cargo to sustain air mobility operations throughout Europe, Africa and Southwest Asia. The 52nd Fighter Wing also supports USAFE's Joint Fires Center of Excellence, whose mission is to conduct joint and combined training focused on the effective integration and application of tactical fires.

Subordinate organizations
The wing is authorized for about 5,560 active-duty members and about 210 Department of Defense civilians. The wing is organized with four groups responsible for operations, maintenance, mission support and medical operations, and has headquarters staff.

52nd Operations Group (52 OG)

52nd Operations Support Squadron (52 OSS)
480th Fighter Squadron (480 FS)

52nd Maintenance Group (52 MXG)
52nd Aircraft Maintenance Squadron (52 AMXS)
52nd Maintenance Operations Squadron (52 MOS)
52nd Equipment Maintenance Squadron (52 EMS)
52nd Component Maintenance Squadron (52 CMS)

52nd Medical Group (52 MDG)
52nd Aerospace Medicine Squadron (52 AMDS)
52nd Dental Squadron (52 DS)
52nd Medical Operations Squadron (52 MDOS)
52nd Medical Support Squadron (52 MDSS)

52nd Mission Support Group (52 MSG)
52nd Civil Engineer Squadron (52 CES)
52nd Communications Squadron (52 CS)
52nd Contracting Squadron (52 CONS)
52nd Force Support Squadron (52 FSS)
52nd Logistics Readiness Squadron (52 LRS)
52nd Security Forces Squadron (52 SFS) 
470th Air Base Squadron (470 ABS) NATO Air Base, Geilenkirchen, Germany

52nd Munitions Maintenance Group (52 MMG) (custody and storage of tactical nuclear weapons)
701st Munitions Support Squadron (701 MUNSS) Kleine Brogel Air Base, Belgium
702nd Munitions Support Squadron (702 MUNSS) Buechel Air Base, Germany
703rd Munitions Support Squadron (703 MUNSS) Volkel Air Base, Netherlands
704th Munitions Support Squadron (704 MUNSS) Ghedi Air Base, Italy

History

Cold War

Established as the 52nd Fighter Wing, All Weather, on 10 May 1948, the wing served in the United States as an air defense unit in the northeastern United States from 1947 until the end of 1968.

The 52nd was reactivated on 18 August 1955 and designated 52nd Fighter Group (Air Defense). It was assigned to Air Defense Command and equipped with North American F-86 Sabre aircraft. It served once more as an air defense unit in the southeastern United States.

In December 1971, it became the host wing at Spangdahlem Air Base, Germany, and inherited tactical squadrons from the 36th Tactical Fighter Wing at nearby Bitburg Air Base. The wing participated in numerous tactical exercises, operations, and tests of USAFE and NATO and provided close air support, interdiction, and base defense operations. It operated with other NATO forces in frequent "squadron exchange" programs and hosted US-based units on temporary duty in Europe. In January 1973, a Wild Weasel defense suppression mission was added. After October 1985, using the F-4 Phantom II model aircraft, defense suppression became the wing's sole tactical mission. In 1987, the 52nd acquired F-16 Falcons and became the first wing to integrate F-16Cs with F-4Gs to form hunter/killer teams within individual fighter squadrons.

It deployed aircraft and personnel to strategic locations in Saudi Arabia and Turkey in support of the liberation of Kuwait from September 1990 – March 1993. Near the end of 1992, it began receiving A-10 Thunderbolt II aircraft. It received F-15 Eagles in 1994 but lost its F-4Gs. In January and December 1999, the wing supported Operations Northern Watch, Allied Force, and Decisive Forge with numerous deployments to Italy and Turkey.

Twenty-first century
Following the terrorist attacks on the World Trade Center and The Pentagon in the United States on September 11, 2001, the 52nd Fighter Wing began preparations for possible combat tasking. Within one month the wing had deployed people and equipment in support of Operation Enduring Freedom in and around Afghanistan. The 22nd Expeditionary Fighter Squadron began flying operations at a deployed location in support of the war on terrorism within 100 hours of tasking notification.

Personnel assigned to the 52nd FW continued to deploy for Operation Enduring Freedom circa 2020.

In April 2010 the wing's strength was reduced by one third. Twenty F-16Cs were flown to the 148th Fighter Wing, Minnesota Air National Guard, one F-16 was transferred to Edwards Air Force Base, California. All aircraft were from the 22nd Fighter Squadron. As a result of the drawdown of F-16s, the 22nd and 23rd Fighter Squadrons were inactivated on 13 August 2010 and formed a single "new" squadron, the 480th Fighter Squadron.

On 18 June 2013, the 81st Fighter Squadron was inactivated at Spangdahlem Air Force Base in Germany. The inactivation marked the end of A-10 operations in Europe at that time.

In December 2014, the wing commander, Col. Peter Bilodeau, who had commanded the wing for six months, was relieved of his command for "a loss of faith and confidence in his leadership."  His deputy served as commander until Col. McFall took command.

On 1 April 2017, the 606th Air Control Squadron, Detachment 1 was inactivated at Spangdahlem Air Base in Germany following the relocation to Aviano Air Base, Italy.

Lineage
 Established as 52nd Fighter Wing, All Weather, on 10 May 1948
 Activated on 9 June 1948
 Redesignated 52nd Fighter-All Weather Wing on 20 January 1950
 Redesignated 52nd Fighter-Interceptor Wing on 1 May 1951
 Inactivated on 6 February 1952, personnel and subordinate units assigned to 4709th Air Defense Wing.
 Redesignated 52nd Fighter Wing (Air Defense), and activated, on 11 April 1963
 Organized on 1 July 1963
 Inactivated on 30 September 1968
 Redesignated 52nd Tactical Fighter Wing on 12 November 1971
 Activated on 31 December 1971
 Redesignated: 52nd Fighter Wing on 1 October 1991.

Assignments

 First Air Force, 9 June 1948
 Attached to Eastern Air Defense Force, 10 November 1949 – 31 August 1950
 Eastern Air Defense Force, 1 September 1950 – 6 February 1952
 Air Defense Command, 11 April 1963
 New York Air Defense Sector, 1 July 1963
 21st Air Division, 1 April 1966
 35th Air Division, 1 December 1967 – 30 September 1968

 Seventeenth Air Force, 31 December 1971
 65th Air Division, 1 June 1985
 Seventeenth Air Force, 30 June 1991
 Third Air Force, 31 July 1996
 United States Air Forces in Europe, 1 November 2005
 Air Command Europe, 18 November 2005
 Third Air Force (Air Forces Europe), 1 December 2006 − present

Components
Wing
 84th Fighter Wing (All Weather): attached 1 June 1949 – 2 June 1951

Group
 52nd Fighter (later, 52nd Operations): 9 June 1948 – 6 February 1952; 31 March 1992 – present

Squadrons
 2nd Fighter-Interceptor Squadron: 1 July 1963 – 30 September 1968
 22nd Fighter Squadron: 1 April 1994 – 13 August 2010
 23rd Fighter Squadron: 31 December 1971 – 13 August 2010 (detached 17 January – 15 March 1991)
 39th Tactical Electronic Warfare Squadron: 31 December 1971 – 1 January 1973
 58th Tactical Fighter Squadron: attached 8–22 August 1975
 81st Tactical Fighter (later, 81st Fighter): 15 January 1973 – 18 June 2013
 98th Fighter-Interceptor Squadron: 1 July 1963 – 30 September 1968
 105th Fighter-Interceptor: attached 1 April 1951 – 6 February 1952
 334th Tactical Fighter Squadron: attached 9–23 September 1975
 335th Tactical Fighter Squadron: attached 11–25 July 1975
 336th Tactical Fighter Squadron: attached 29 August – 20 September 1976
 457th Tactical Fighter Squadron: attached 13–27 August 1977
 480th Tactical Fighter (later, 480th Fighter): 15 November 1976 – 31 March 1992; 13 August 2010 – present
 562nd Tactical Fighter Squadron: attached 12–30 August 1977
 606th Air Control Squadron: 30 Sept 1995 - 1 April 2017

Stations
 Mitchel Field (later, Air Force Base), New York, 9 June 1948
 McGuire Air Force Base, New Jersey, 4 October 1949 – 6 February 1952
 Suffolk County Air Force Base, New York, 1 July 1963 – 30 September 1968
 Spangdahlem Air Base, Germany, 31 December 1971 – present

Aircraft operated

P/F-51 Mustang (1947–1948)
F-82 Twin Mustang (1948–1952)
F-94 Starfire (1950–1952)
 F-47 Thunderbolt (1951–1952)
F-101 Voodoo (1963–1968)
B-66 Destroyer (1971–1972)
F-4 Phantom II (1971–1994)
B-57 Canberra, 1974,1975
A-7 Corsair II (1976)
F-105 Thunderchief (1976–1977)
F-15 Eagle (1994–1999)
F-16 Fighting Falcon (1987–present)
A-10 Thunderbolt II (1992–2013)

See also

References

Notes

Citations

Bibliography

 Ivie, Tom and Paul Ludwig. Spitfires and Yellow Tail Mustangs: The 52d Fighter Group in World War 2. Crowborough, East Sussex, UK: Hikoki Publications, 2005. .

External links
 Spangdahlem AB home page

052
United States military in Germany
Military units and formations established in 1948